Fartura may refer to:
Fartura do Piauí, a municipality in the state of Piauí in the Northeast region of Brazil.
Fartura (municipality), a municipality in the state of São Paulo in Brazil.
Fartura (food), a doughnut that is fried in oil, in the form of a roll.
Da Fartura River, a river of Paraná state in southern Brazil.

See also